Congressional districts in the United States are electoral divisions for the purpose of electing members of the United States House of Representatives. The number of voting seats in the House of Representatives is currently set at 435, with each one representing an average of 761,179 people following the 2020 United States census. The  number of voting seats has applied since 1913, excluding a temporary increase to 437 after the admissions of Alaska and Hawaii. The total number of state members is capped by the Reapportionment Act of 1929. In addition, each of the five inhabited U.S. territories and the federal district of Washington, D. C., sends a non-voting delegate to the House of Representatives.

The Bureau of the Census conducts a constitutionally mandated decennial census whose figures are used to determine the number of congressional districts to which each state is entitled, in a process called "apportionment". The 2022 elections were the first to be based on the congressional districts which were defined based on the 2020 United States census.

Each state is responsible for the redistricting of districts within their state, while several states have one "at-large" division. Redistricting must take place if the number of members changes following a re-apportionment, or may take place at any other time if demographics represented in a district have changed substantially. Setting the boundaries of states' congressional districts is the responsibility of state governments, who often gerrymander districts for various reasons. Districts may sometimes retain the same boundaries, while changing their district numbers.

The following is a complete list of the 435 current congressional districts for the House of Representatives, and over 200 obsolete districts, and the six current and one obsolete non-voting delegations.

Extremes

Population 

 Average population: 761,169 people based on 2020 U.S. census. It was 710,767 in 2010.
 State with the most people in the average district: Delaware (989,948). In 2010, Montana: 994,416.
 State with the fewest people in the average district: Montana (542,113). In 2010, Rhode Island: 527,624.
 District with the most people:  (989,948). In 2010, : 994,416.
 District with the fewest people:  (545,085). In 2010, also : 526,283.

Area 
 District with the greatest area: , same as in 2010.
 District with the greatest area that comprises less than an entire state: . In 2010: .
 District with the smallest area: . In 2010: .

Oldest district 
 , same geographical borders since 1789.

American Human Development Index 
 District with the highest American Human Development Index score: .
 District with the lowest American Human Development Index score: .

Alabama 

 : 1818–1819 (obsolete since statehood)
 : 1819–1823, 1841–1843, 1873–1877, 1913–1917, 1963–1965 (obsolete)
 : 1823–1841, 1843–1963, 1965–present
 : 1823–1841, 1843–1963, 1965–present
 : 1823–1841, 1843–1963, 1965–present
 : 1833–1841, 1843–1963, 1965–present
 : 1833–1841, 1843–1963, 1965–present
 : 1843–1963, 1965–present
 : 1843–1863, 1877–1963, 1965–present
 : 1877–1963, 1965–1973 (obsolete since the 1970 census)
 : 1893–1963 (obsolete since the 1960 census)
 : 1917–1933 (obsolete since the 1930 census)

Alaska 

 : 1906–1959 (obsolete since statehood)
 : 1959–present

American Samoa 
See Non-voting delegations, below.

Arizona 

 : 1863–1912 (obsolete since statehood)
 : 1912–1949 (obsolete)
 : 1949–present
 : 1949–present
 : 1963–present
 : 1973–present
 : 1983–present
 : 1993–present
 : 2003–present
 : 2003–present
 : 2013–present

Arkansas 

 : 1819–1836 (obsolete since statehood)
 : 1836–1853, 1873–1875, 1883–1885 (obsolete)
 : 1853–present
 : 1853–present
 : 1863–present
 : 1875–present
 : 1885–1963 (obsolete since the 1960 census)
 : 1893–1963 (obsolete since the 1960 census)
 : 1903–1953 (obsolete since the 1950 census)

California 

 : 1849–1865, 1883–1885 (obsolete)
 : 1865–present
 : 1865–present
 : 1865–present
 : 1873–present
 : 1885–present
 : 1885–present
 : 1893–present
 : 1903–present
 : 1913–present
 : 1913–present
 : 1913–present
 : 1933–present
 : 1933–present
 : 1933–present
 : 1933–present
 : 1933–present
 : 1933–present
 : 1933–present
 : 1933–present
 : 1933–present
 : 1943–present
 : 1943–present
 : 1943–present
 : 1953–present
 : 1953–present
 : 1953–present
 : 1953–present
 : 1953–present
 : 1953–present
 : 1953–present
 : 1963–present
 : 1963–present
 : 1963–present
 : 1963–present
 : 1963–present
 : 1963–present
 : 1963–present
 : 1963–present
 : 1973–present
 : 1973–present
 : 1973–present
 : 1973–present
 : 1973–present
 : 1983–present
 : 1983–present
 : 1993–present
 : 1993–present
 : 1993–present
 : 1993–present
 : 1993–present
 : 1993–present
 : 1993–present
 : 2003–2023 (obsolete due to the 2020 census)

Colorado 

 : 1861–1876 (obsolete since statehood)
 : 1876–1893, 1903–1915 (obsolete)
 : 1893–present
 : 1893–present
 : 1915–present
 : 1915–present
 : 1973–present
 : 1983–present
 : 2003–present
 : 2023–present

Connecticut 

 : 1789–1837, 1903–1913, 1933–1965 (obsolete)
 : 1837–present
 : 1837–present
 : 1837–present
 : 1837–present
 : 1837–1843, 1913–present
 : 1837–1843, 1965–2003 (obsolete since the 2000 census)

Delaware 

 : 1789–present

The oldest district in the country, it has never changed its shape or size. From 1813 to 1823, Delaware had two representatives — both chosen at-large on a general ticket from the same statewide district.

District of Columbia 
See Non-voting delegations, below.

Florida 

 : 1822–1845 (obsolete since statehood)
 : 1845–1875, 1913–1915, 1933–1937, 1943–1945 (obsolete)
 : 1875–present
 : 1875–present
 : 1903–present
 : 1915–present
 : 1937–present
 : 1945–present
 : 1953–present
 : 1953–present
 : 1963–present
 : 1963–present
 : 1963–present
 : 1963–present
 : 1973–present
 : 1973–present
 : 1973–present
 : 1983–present
 : 1983–present
 : 1983–present
 : 1983–present
 : 1993–present
 : 1993–present
 : 1993–present
 : 1993–present
 : 2003–present
 : 2003–present
 : 2013–present
 : 2013–present
 : 2023–present

Georgia 

 : 1793–1827, 1829–1845, 1883–1885 (obsolete)
 : 1789–1793, 1827–1829, 1845–present
 : 1789–1793, 1827–1829, 1845–present
 : 1789–1793, 1827–1829, 1845–present
 : 1827–1829, 1845–present
 : 1827–1829, 1845–present
 : 1827–1829, 1845–present
 : 1827–1829, 1845–present
 : 1845–1863, 1873–present
 : 1873–present
 : 1885–present
 : 1893–1933, 1993–present
 : 1913–1933, 2003–present
 : 2003–present
 : 2013–present

Guam 
See Non-voting delegations, below.

Hawaii 

 : 1900–1959 (obsolete since statehood)
 : 1959–1971 (obsolete)
 : 1971–present
 : 1971–present

Idaho 

 : 1864–1890 (obsolete since statehood)
 : 1890–1919 (obsolete)
 : 1919–present
 : 1919–present

Illinois 

 : 1812–1818 (obsolete since statehood)
 : 1818–1833, 1863–1873, 1893–1895, 1913–1949 (obsolete)
 : 1833–present
 : 1833–present
 : 1833–present
 : 1843–present
 : 1843–present
 : 1843–present
 : 1843–present
 : 1853–present
 : 1853–present
 : 1863–present
 : 1863–present
 : 1863–present
 : 1863–present
 : 1873–present
 : 1873–present
 : 1873–present
 : 1873–present
 : 1873–2023 (obsolete due to the 2020 census)
 : 1873–2013 (obsolete since the 2010 census)
 : 1883–2003 (obsolete since the 2000 census)
 : 1895–1993 (obsolete since the 1990 census)
 : 1895–1993 (obsolete since the 1990 census)
 : 1903–1983 (obsolete since the 1980 census)
 : 1903–1983 (obsolete since the 1980 census)
 : 1903–1963 (obsolete since the 1960 census)
 : 1949–1953 (obsolete since the 1950 census)

Indiana 

 : 1805–1816 (obsolete since statehood)
 : 1816–1823, 1873–1875 (obsolete)
 : 1823–present
 : 1823–present
 : 1823–present
 : 1833–present
 : 1833–present
 : 1833–present
 : 1833–present
 : 1843–present
 : 1843–present
 : 1843–2003 (obsolete since the 2000 census)
 : 1853–1983 (obsolete since the 1980 census)
 : 1875–1943 (obsolete since the 1940 census)
 : 1875–1933 (obsolete since the 1930 census)

Iowa 

 : 1838–1846 (obsolete since statehood)
 : 1846–1847 (obsolete)
 : 1847–present
 : 1847–present
 : 1863–present
 : 1863–present
 : 1863–2013 (obsolete since the 2010 census)
 : 1863–1993 (obsolete since the 1990 census)
 : 1873–1973 (obsolete since the 1970 census)
 : 1873–1963 (obsolete since the 1960 census)
 : 1873–1943 (obsolete since the 1940 census)
 : 1883–1933 (obsolete since the 1930 census)
 : 1883–1933 (obsolete since the 1930 census)

Kansas 

 : 1854–1861 (obsolete since statehood)
 : 1861–1875, 1883–1885, 1893–1907 (obsolete)
 : 1875–present
 : 1875–present
 : 1875–present
 : 1885–present
 : 1885–1993 (obsolete since the 1990 census)
 : 1885–1963 (obsolete since the 1960 census)
 : 1885–1943 (obsolete since the 1940 census)
 : 1907–1933 (obsolete since the 1930 census)

Kentucky 

 : 1933–1935 (obsolete)
 : 1792–1933, 1935–present
 : 1792–1933, 1935–present
 : 1803–1933, 1935–present
 : 1803–1933, 1935–present
 : 1803–1933, 1935–present
 : 1803–1933, 1935–present
 : 1813–1933, 1935–1993 (obsolete since the 1990 census)
 : 1813–1933, 1935–1963 (obsolete since the 1960 census)
 : 1813–1933, 1935–1953 (obsolete since the 1950 census)
 : 1813–1863, 1873–1933 (obsolete since the 1930 census)
 : 1823–1843, 1883–1933 (obsolete since the 1930 census)
 : 1823–1843 (obsolete since the 1840 census)
 : 1833–1843 (obsolete since the 1840 census)

Louisiana 

 : 1806–1812 (obsolete since statehood)
 : 1812–1823, 1873–1875 (obsolete)
 : 1823–present
 : 1823–present
 : 1823–present
 : 1843–present
 : 1863–present
 : 1875–present
 : 1903–2013 (obsolete since the 2010 census)
 : 1913–1993 (obsolete since the 1990 census)

Maine 

Until 1820, Maine was part of Massachusetts. After the 1810 census, Massachusetts was allocated 20 districts. Seven Massachusetts districts (then numbered  through ) were credited to Maine soon after it became a state in 1820. See District of Maine.

 : 1820–1821, 1883–1885 (obsolete)
 : 1821–1883, 1885–present
 : 1821–1883, 1885–present
 : 1821–1883, 1885–1963 (obsolete since the 1960 census)
 : 1821–1883, 1885–1933 (obsolete since the 1930 census)
 : 1821–1883 (obsolete since the 1880 census)
 : 1821–1863 (obsolete since the 1860 census)
 : 1821–1853 (obsolete since the 1850 census)
 : 1833–1843 (obsolete since the 1840 census)

Maryland 

 : 1963–1967 (obsolete)
 : 1789–present
 : 1789–present
 : 1789–present
 : 1789–present
 : 1789–present
 : 1789–1863, 1873–present
 : 1793–1843, 1953–present
 : 1793–1835, 1967–present

Massachusetts 

 : 1793–1795 (obsolete)
 : 1789–present
 : 1789–present
 : 1789–present
 : 1789–present
 : 1789–1793, 1795–present
 : 1789–1793, 1795–present
 : 1789–1793, 1795–present
 : 1789–1793, 1795–present
 : 1795–present
 : 1795–2013 (obsolete since the 2010 census)
 : 1795–1843, 1853–1863, 1873–1993 (obsolete since the 1990 census)
 : 1795–1843, 1883–1983 (obsolete since the 1980 census)
 : 1795–1833, 1893–1963 (obsolete since the 1960 census)
 : 1795–1820 (moved to Maine), 1903–1963 (obsolete since the 1960 census)
 : 1803–1820 (moved to Maine), 1913–1943 (obsolete since the 1940 census)
 : 1803–1820 (moved to Maine), 1913–1933 (obsolete since the 1930 census)
 : 1803–1820 (obsolete since 1820 move to Maine)
 : 1813–1820 (obsolete since 1820 move to Maine)
 : 1813–1820 (obsolete since 1820 move to Maine)
 : 1813–1820 (obsolete since 1820 move to Maine)

Michigan 

 : 1819–1837 (obsolete since statehood)
 : 1837–1843, 1913–1915, 1963–1965 (obsolete)
 : 1843–present
 : 1843–present
 : 1843–present
 : 1853–present
 : 1863–present
 : 1863–present
 : 1873–present
 : 1873–present
 : 1873–present
 : 1883–present
 : 1883–present
 : 1893–present
 : 1915–present
 : 1933–2023 (obsolete since the 2020 census)
 : 1933–2013 (obsolete since the 2010 census)
 : 1933–2003 (obsolete since the 2000 census)
 : 1933–1993 (obsolete since the 1990 census)
 : 1953–1993 (obsolete since the 1990 census)
 : 1965–1983 (obsolete since the 1980 census)

Minnesota 

 : 1849–1858 (obsolete since statehood)
 : 1858–1863, 1913–1915, 1933–1935 (obsolete)
 : 1863–1933, 1935–present
 : 1863–1933, 1935–present
 : 1873–1933, 1935–present
 : 1883–1933, 1935–present
 : 1883–1933, 1935–present
 : 1893–1933, 1935–present
 : 1893–1933, 1935–present
 : 1903–1933, 1935–present
 : 1903–1933, 1935–1963 (obsolete since the 1960 census)
 : 1915–1933 (obsolete since the 1930 census)

Mississippi 

 : 1801–1817 (obsolete since statehood)
 : 1817–1847, 1853–1855 (obsolete)
 : 1847–present
 : 1847–present
 : 1847–present
 : 1847–present
 : 1855–2003 (obsolete since the 2000 census)
 : 1873–1963 (obsolete since the 1960 census)
 : 1883–1953 (obsolete since the 1950 census)
 : 1903–1933 (obsolete since the 1930 census)

Missouri 

 : 1812–1821 (obsolete since statehood)
 : 1821–1847, 1933–1935 (obsolete)
 : 1847–1933, 1935–present
 : 1847–1933, 1935–present
 : 1847–1933, 1935–present
 : 1847–1933, 1935–present
 : 1847–1933, 1935–present
 : 1853–1933, 1935–present
 : 1853–1933, 1935–present
 : 1863–1933, 1935–present
 : 1863–1933, 1935–2013 (obsolete since the 2010 census)
 : 1873–1933, 1935–1983 (obsolete since the 1980 census)
 : 1873–1933, 1935–1963 (obsolete since the 1960 census)
 : 1873–1933, 1935–1953 (obsolete since the 1950 census)
 : 1873–1933, 1935–1953 (obsolete since the 1950 census)
 : 1883–1933 (obsolete since the 1930 census)
 : 1893–1933 (obsolete since the 1930 census)
 : 1903–1933 (obsolete since the 1930 census)

Montana 

 : 1865–1889 (obsolete since statehood)
 : 1889–1919, 1993–2023 (obsolete)
 : 1919–1993, 2023–present
 : 1919–1993, 2023–present

Nebraska 

 : 1855–1867 (obsolete since statehood)
 : 1867–1883 (obsolete)
 : 1883–present
 : 1883–present
 : 1883–present
 : 1893–1963 (obsolete since the 1960 census)
 : 1893–1943 (obsolete since the 1940 census)
 : 1893–1933 (obsolete since the 1930 census)

Nevada 

 : 1861–1864 (obsolete since statehood)
 : 1864–1983 (obsolete)
 : 1983–present
 : 1983–present
 : 2003–present
 : 2013–present

New Hampshire 

 : 1789–1847 (obsolete)
 : 1847–present
 : 1847–present
 : 1847–1883 (obsolete since the 1880 census)
 : 1847–1853 (obsolete since the 1850 census)

New Jersey 

 : 1789–1799, 1801–1813, 1815–1843 (obsolete)
 : 1799–1801, 1813–1815, 1843–present
 : 1799–1801, 1813–1815, 1843–present
 : 1799–1801, 1813–1815, 1843–present
 : 1799–1801, 1843–present
 : 1799–1801, 1843–present
 : 1873–present
 : 1873–present
 : 1893–present
 : 1903–present
 : 1903–present
 : 1913–present
 : 1913–present
 : 1933–2013 (obsolete since the 2010 census)
 : 1933–1993 (obsolete since the 1990 census)
 : 1963–1983 (obsolete since the 1980 census)

New Mexico 

 : 1851–1912 (obsolete since statehood)
 : 1912–1969 (obsolete)
 : 1969–present
 : 1969–present
 : 1983–present

New York 

 : 1873–1875, 1883–1885, 1933–1945 (obsolete)
 : 1789–present
 : 1789–present
 : 1789–present
 : 1789–present
 : 1789–present
 : 1789–present
 : 1793–present
 : 1793–present
 : 1793–present
 : 1793–present
 : 1803–present
 : 1803–present
 : 1803–present
 : 1803–present
 : 1803–present
 : 1803–1809, 1813–present
 : 1803–1809, 1813–present
 : 1813–present
 : 1813–present
 : 1813–present
 : 1813–present
 : 1821–present
 : 1823–present
 : 1823–present
 : 1823–present
 : 1823–present
 : 1823–2023 (obsolete due to the 2020 census)
 : 1823–2013 (obsolete since the 2010 census)
 : 1823–2013 (obsolete since the 2010 census)
 : 1823–2003 (obsolete since the 2000 census)
 : 1833–2003 (obsolete since the 2000 census)
 : 1833–1863, 1873–1993 (obsolete since the 1990 census)
 : 1833–1863, 1875–1993 (obsolete since the 1990 census)
 : 1843–1853, 1885–1993 (obsolete since the 1990 census)
 : 1903–1983 (obsolete since the 1980 census)
 : 1903–1983 (obsolete since the 1980 census)
 : 1903–1983 (obsolete since the 1980 census)
 : 1913–1983 (obsolete since the 1980 census)
 : 1913–1983 (obsolete since the 1980 census)
 : 1913–1973 (obsolete since the 1970 census)
 : 1913–1973 (obsolete since the 1970 census)
 : 1913–1963 (obsolete since the 1960 census)
 : 1913–1963 (obsolete since the 1960 census)
 : 1945–1953 (obsolete since the 1950 census)
 : 1945–1953 (obsolete since the 1950 census)

North Carolina 

 : 1883–1885 (obsolete)
 : 1789–present
 : 1789–present
 : 1789–present
 : 1789–present
 : 1789–present
 : 1793–present
 : 1793–present
 : 1793–1863, 1873–present
 : 1793–1853, 1885–present
 : 1793–1843, 1903–present
 : 1803–1843, 1933–present
 : 1803–1843, 1943–1963, 1993–present
 : 1813–1843, 2003–present
 : 2023–present

North Dakota 

 : 1861–1889 (obsolete since statehood)
 : 1889–1913, 1933–1963, 1973–present
 : 1913–1933, 1963–1973 (obsolete since the 1970 census)
 : 1913–1933, 1963–1973 (obsolete since the 1970 census)
 : 1913–1933 (obsolete since the 1930 census)

Northern Mariana Islands 
 See Non-voting delegations, below.

Ohio 

 : 1799–1803 (obsolete since statehood)
 : 1803–1813, 1913–1915, 1933–1953, 1963–1967 (obsolete)
 : 1813–present
 : 1813–present
 : 1813–present
 : 1813–present
 : 1813–present
 : 1813–present
 : 1823–present
 : 1823–present
 : 1823–present
 : 1823–present
 : 1823–present
 : 1823–present
 : 1823–present
 : 1823–present
 : 1833–present
 : 1833–2023 (obsolete due to the 2020 census)
 : 1833–2013 (obsolete since the 2010 census)
 : 1833–2013 (obsolete since the 2010 census)
 : 1833–2003 (obsolete since the 2000 census)
 : 1843–1863, 1873–1993 (obsolete since the 1990 census)
 : 1843–1863, 1883–1993 (obsolete since the 1990 census)
 : 1915–1983 (obsolete since the 1980 census)
 : 1953–1983 (obsolete since the 1980 census)
 : 1967–1973 (obsolete since the 1970 census)

Oklahoma 

 : 1890–1907 (obsolete since statehood)
 : 1913–1915, 1933–1943 (obsolete)
 : 1907–present
 : 1907–present
 : 1907–present
 : 1907–present
 : 1907–present
 : 1915–2003 (obsolete since the 2000 census)
 : 1915–1953 (obsolete since the 1950 census)
 : 1915–1953 (obsolete since the 1950 census)

Oregon 

 : 1849–1859 (obsolete since statehood)
 : 1859–1893 (obsolete)
 : 1893–present
 : 1893–present
 : 1913–present
 : 1943–present
 : 1983–present
 : 2023–present

Pennsylvania 

 : 1789–1791, 1793–1795, 1873–1875, 1883–1889, 1893–1903, 1913–1923, 1943–1945 (obsolete)
 : 1791–1793, 1795–present
 : 1791–1793, 1795–present
 : 1791–1793, 1795–present
 : 1791–1793, 1795–present
 : 1791–1793, 1795–present
 : 1791–1793, 1795–present
 : 1791–1793, 1795–present
 : 1791–1793, 1795–present
 : 1795–present
 : 1795–present
 : 1795–present
 : 1795–1803, 1813–present
 : 1813–present
 : 1813–present
 : 1813–present
 : 1823–present
 : 1823–present
 : 1823–2023 (obsolete due to the 2020 census)
 : 1833–2013 (obsolete since the 2010 census)
 : 1833–2003 (obsolete since the 2000 census)
 : 1833–2003 (obsolete since the 2000 census)
 : 1833–1993 (obsolete since the 1990 census)
 : 1833–1993 (obsolete since the 1990 census)
 : 1833–1983 (obsolete since the 1980 census)
 : 1833–1843, 1853–1863, 1875–1983 (obsolete since the 1980 census)
 : 1875–1973 (obsolete since the 1970 census)
 : 1875–1973 (obsolete since the 1970 census)
 : 1889–1963 (obsolete since the 1960 census)
 : 1903–1963 (obsolete since the 1960 census)
 : 1903–1963 (obsolete since the 1960 census)
 : 1903–1953 (obsolete since the 1950 census)
 : 1903–1953 (obsolete since the 1950 census)
 : 1923–1953 (obsolete since the 1950 census)
 : 1923–1943 (obsolete since the 1940 census)
 : 1923–1933 (obsolete since the 1930 census)
 : 1923–1933 (obsolete since the 1930 census)

Philippines
See Non-voting delegations, below.

Puerto Rico
See Non-voting delegations, below.

Rhode Island 

 : 1790–1843 (obsolete)
 : 1843–present
 : 1843–present
 : 1913–1933 (obsolete since the 1930 census)

South Carolina 

 : 1873–1875 (obsolete)
 : 1789–present
 : 1789–present
 : 1789–present
 : 1789–present
 : 1789–1863, 1875–present
 : 1793–1863, 1883–present
 : 1803–1853, 1883–1933, 2013–present
 : 1803–1843 (obsolete since the 1840 census)
 : 1813–1843 (obsolete since the 1840 census)

South Dakota 

  1861–1889 (obsolete since statehood)
 : 1889–1913, 1983–present
 : 1913–1983 (obsolete since the 1980 census)
 : 1913–1983 (obsolete since the 1980 census)
 : 1913–1933 (obsolete since the 1930 census)

Tennessee 

 : 1794–1796 (obsolete since statehood)
 : 1796–1805, 1873–1875 (obsolete)
 : 1805–present
 : 1805–present
 : 1805–present
 : 1813–present
 : 1813–present
 : 1813–present
 : 1823–present
 : 1823–present
 : 1823–1863, 1873–1973, 1983–present
 : 1833–1863, 1875–1933, 1943–1953 (obsolete since the 1950 census)
 : 1833–1853 (obsolete since the 1850 census)
 : 1833–1843 (obsolete since the 1840 census)
 : 1833–1843 (obsolete since the 1840 census)

Texas 

 : 1873–1875, 1913–1919, 1933–1935, 1953–1959, 1963–1967 (obsolete)
 : 1845–present
 : 1845–present
 : 1863–present
 : 1863–present
 : 1875–present
 : 1875–present
 : 1883–present
 : 1883–present
 : 1883–present
 : 1883–present
 : 1883–present
 : 1893–present
 : 1893–present
 : 1903–present
 : 1903–present
 : 1903–present
 : 1919–present
 : 1919–present
 : 1935–present
 : 1935–present
 : 1935–present
 : 1959–present
 : 1967–present
 : 1973–present
 : 1983–present
 : 1983–present
 : 1983–present
 : 1993–present
 : 1993–present
 : 1993–present
 : 2003–present
 : 2003–present
 : 2013–present
 : 2013–present
 : 2013–present
 : 2013–present
 : 2023–present
 : 2023–present

U.S. Virgin Islands 
See Non-voting delegations, below.

Utah 

 : 1851–1896 (obsolete since statehood)
 : 1896–1913 (obsolete)
 : 1913–present
 : 1913–present
 : 1983–present
 : 2013–present

Vermont 

 : 1813–1821, 1823–1825, 1933–present
 : 1791–1813, 1821–1823, 1825–1933 (obsolete since the 1930 census)
 : 1791–1813, 1821–1823, 1825–1933 (obsolete since the 1930 census)
 : 1803–1813, 1821–1823, 1825–1883 (obsolete since the 1880 census)
 : 1803–1813, 1821–1823, 1825–1853 (obsolete since the 1850 census)
 : 1821–1823, 1825–1843 (obsolete since the 1840 census)
 : 1821–1823 (obsolete since the 1820 census)

Virginia 

 : 1883–1885, 1933–1935 (obsolete)
 : 1789–1933, 1935–present
 : 1789–1933, 1935–present
 : 1789–1933, 1935–present
 : 1789–1933, 1935–present
 : 1789–1933, 1935–present
 : 1789–1933, 1935–present
 : 1789–1933, 1935–present
 : 1789–1933, 1935–present
 : 1789–1863, 1873–1933, 1935–present
 : 1789–1863, 1885–1933, 1953–present
 : 1793–1863, 1993–present
 : 1793–1863 (obsolete since the 1863 move to West Virginia)
 : 1793–1863 (obsolete since the 1863 move to West Virginia)
 : 1793–1853 (obsolete since the 1850 census)
 : 1793–1853 (obsolete since the 1850 census)
 : 1793–1843 (obsolete since the 1840 census)
 : 1793–1843 (obsolete since the 1840 census)
 : 1793–1843 (obsolete since the 1840 census)
 : 1793–1843 (obsolete since the 1840 census)
 : 1803–1843 (obsolete since the 1840 census)
 : 1803–1843 (obsolete since the 1840 census)
 : 1803–1833 (obsolete since the 1830 census)
 : 1813–1823 (obsolete since the 1820 census)

Washington 

 : 1854–1889 (obsolete since statehood)
 : 1889–1909, 1913–1915, 1953–1959 (obsolete)
 : 1909–present
 : 1909–present
 : 1909–present
 : 1915–present
 : 1915–present
 : 1933–present
 : 1959–present
 : 1983–present
 : 1993–present
 : 2013–present

West Virginia 

 : 1913–1917 (obsolete)
 : 1863–present
 : 1863–present
 : 1863–2023 (obsolete due to the 2020 census)
 : 1883–1993 (obsolete since the 1990 census)
 : 1903–1973 (obsolete since the 1970 census)
 : 1917–1963 (obsolete since the 1960 census)

Wisconsin 
 : 1848–present
 : 1848–present
 : 1849–present
 : 1863–present
 : 1863–present
 : 1863–present
 : 1873–present
 : 1873–present
 : 1883–2003 (obsolete since the 2000 census)
 : 1893–1973 (obsolete since the 1970 census)
 : 1903–1933 (obsolete since the 1930 census)

Wyoming 

 : 1869–1890 (obsolete since statehood)
 : 1890–present

Non-voting delegations 

 , 1978–present
 Cherokee Nation, 1835 & 2019–present (yet to be seated)
 Choctaw Nation, 1830 (never seated)
 , 1871–1875 & 1971–present
 , 1970–present
 , 2009–present
 , 1907–1946 (obsolete since independence)
 , 1901–present
 , 1970–present

List of current districts by area
This list includes the 435 current voting districts (2018–2023), along with the 6 non-voting delegations. These geographic values reflect the changes to Pennsylvania's congressional districts in 2018.

See also 

 List of current members of the U.S. House of Representatives
 United States congressional district
 Apportionment
 United States congressional apportionment
 General ticket
 Redistricting
 Apportionment paradox
 Gerrymandering
 Voting Rights Act
 Representation
 United States Census Bureau
 Better Know a District: A recurring segment on The Colbert Report, in which Stephen Colbert profiled a congressional district and interviewed its representative. Described by Colbert as a "435-part series".

Comparisons 
 Constituency
 Australia
 Canada
 European Parliament
 France
 Ireland
 New Zealand
 Philippines
 Singapore: Group Representation Constituency, Non-Constituency Member of Parliament
 United Kingdom

Notes

References

External links 

 Find a Senator or Representative via Govtrack.us
 United States Census Bureau:
 Congressional Apportionment
 Census Redistricting Data Office
 Geography division
 National Atlas Printable District Maps
 

 
United States
Congressional districts